John Underwood is a PR adviser, now executive director of Freshwater UK PLC. He founded the Clear consultancy in 1991 after work as a reporter and presenter for the BBC, ITV and Channel 4, including many editions of After Dark. He was Director of Communications for the British Labour Party from June 1990 to June 1991.

He hit the news in November 2006 for being behind an "independent" report that recommended the closure of a popular Hertfordshire hospital, in line with government policy. He was again in the news in January 2008 for setting up the mysterious Progressive Policies Forum, an organization with no employees and apparently engaged in no activity other than channelling funds to the election campaign of Peter Hain for the deputy leadership of the Labour Party in 2007.

References

External links
 Freshwater UK PLC

Living people
British public relations people
Year of birth missing (living people)